Ansovell is a locality located in the municipality of Cava, Lleida, in Province of Lleida province, Catalonia, Spain. As of 2020, it has a population of 24.

Geography 
Ansovell is located 158km northeast of Lleida.

References

Populated places in the Province of Lleida